The 2018 United States House of Representatives elections in Louisiana were held on November 6, 2018, to elect the six U.S. representatives from the state of Louisiana, one from each of the state's six congressional districts. The elections coincided with other elections to the House of Representatives, elections to the United States Senate, and various state and local elections.

Like most Louisiana elections, these were conducted using a jungle primary that occurred on November 6, where all candidates ran on the same ballot in the primary, regardless of party. Any candidate who earned an absolute majority of the vote in the primary would be automatically declared the winner of the election. However, if in any given congressional district no candidate gained an absolute majority of the votes, a runoff election between the top two candidates within said congressional district would have been held on December 8. Nevertheless, the incumbent Representatives in all six districts each earned over 50% of the vote in the jungle primaries, so no runoffs occurred.

Overview

By district
Results of the 2018 United States House of Representatives elections in Louisiana by district:

District 1

The 1st district is located in the Greater New Orleans area, covering much of the southeastern area of Louisiana along the Mississippi River Delta, taking in Dulac, Hammond, and Slidell. This is a heavily Republican district with a PVI of R+24. Incumbent Steve Scalise has represented this district since 2008 and was reelected in 2016 with 75%.

General election

Results

District 2

The 2nd district stretches from New Orleans westward towards Baton Rouge and the surrounding areas. This is a heavily Democratic district with a PVI of D+25. Incumbent Democrat Cedric Richmond has represented this district since 2011 and won reelection in 2016 with 70%.

General election

Results

District 3

The 3rd district is located within the Acadiana region and includes Lafayette, Lake Charles, and New Iberia. Incumbent Republican Clay Higgins was initially elected in 2016 with 56% of the vote. This is a reliably Republican district with a PVI of R+20.

General election

Results

District 4

The 4th district is located in Northwest Louisiana, taking in the Ark-La-Tex region, including Minden and Shreveport. This is a heavily Republican district with a PVI of R+13. Incumbent Republican Mike Johnson was initially elected in 2016 with 65% of the vote.

General election

Results

District 5

The 5th district is located in the northern Louisiana region, including the Monroe metro area. The district continues to stretch down into Central Louisiana taking in Alexandria and then expanding eastward into the Florida Parishes. This is a moderate to solid Republican district with a PVI of R+15. Incumbent Republican Ralph Abraham was initially elected in 2014, and was reelected in 2016 with 81% of the vote.

General election

Results

District 6

The 6th district is located within the Baton Rouge metropolitan area, including Central City, Denham Springs, and parts of the state capital, Baton Rouge. The district also stretches down into Acadiana taking in Thibodaux and parts of Houma. This is a strong Republican district with a PVI of R+19. Republican Garret Graves has represented this district since 2015 and was reelected in 2016 with 63% of the vote.

General election

Results

References

External links
Official campaign websites of first district candidates
Lee Ann Dugas (D) for Congress
Jim Francis (D) for Congress
Howard Kearney (L) for Congress
Steve Scalise (R) for Congress

Official campaign websites of second district candidates
Cedric Richmond (D) for Congress
Shawndra Rodriguez (NPP) for Congress
Jesse Schmidt (NF) for Congress

Official campaign websites of third district candidates
Rob Anderson (D) for Congress
Aaron Andrus (L) for Congress
Josh Guillory (R) for Congress
Clay Higgins (R) for Congress
Mimi Methvin (D) for Congress
Larry Rader (D) for Congress
Verone Thomas (D) for Congress

Official campaign websites of fourth district candidates
Mark David Halverson (NPP) for Congress
Mike Johnson (R) for Congress
Ryan Trundle (D) for Congress

Official campaign websites of fifth district candidates
Ralph Abraham (R) for Congress
Billy Burkette (I) for Congress
Jessee Carlton Fleenor (D) for Congress

Official campaign websites of sixth district candidates
Justin DeWitt (D) for Congress
Garret Graves (R) for Congress
Andie Saizan (D) for Congress

2018
Louisiana
United States House of Representatives